Rudinská is a village and municipality in Kysucké Nové Mesto District in the Žilina Region of northern Slovakia.

History
In historical records the village was first mentioned in 1598.

Geography
The municipality lies at an altitude of 480 metres and covers an area of 10.768 km². It has a population of about 996 people.

References

External links
 Rudinská local website

Villages and municipalities in Kysucké Nové Mesto District